Mitzpe Yair (lit. Yair Lookout) is an unauthorized Israeli settlement in the West Bank. Located two kilometres south-east of Susya, it falls under the jurisdiction of Har Hebron Regional Council. It consists of 15 prefabricated structures, and is home for several families.

History
Mitzpe Yair was established by Meir Am-Shalem in October 1998, and, according to Gideon Levy, was a price tag operation set up as Magen David Farm in retribution for the murder of a Susya settler, Yair Har-Sinai, after whom it was subsequently renamed.

Legal status
Mitzpe Yair is an unauthorized settlement that is regarded as illegal by the Israeli regional administration. In 2007 Peace Now revealed that a police superintendent was residing there despite its illegal status. The officer was ordered to evacuate his house by July that year.

The international community considers all Israeli settlements in the West Bank illegal under international law, but the Israeli government disputes this in regard to those settlements who do have state authorization.

A vineyard in a wadi, planted on privately owned Palestinian land, and run by Elad Movshoviz,  produces 7,000 bottles per annum. A legal case on the ownership of the area was, as of 2012, pending before the Israeli High Court of Justice.

References

External links
Peace Now's Information

Israeli settlements in the West Bank
Populated places established in 1998
Unauthorized Israeli settlements